"Offspring" is episode 7 of season 3 in the television show Angel. Written by David Greenwalt and directed by Turi Meyer, it was original broadcast on November 5, 2001 on the WB television network. While Angel and the crew research a prophecy predicting the imminent arrival of a being who may have a profound impact on the world, Darla, pregnant and angry, arrives at the hotel looking for Angel, who is shocked to learn that he is Darla's unborn child's father.  Baffled by Darla's condition, Angel struggles to discover the nature of their unborn child and turns to Lorne for some insight on this situation, while Darla gets a sympathetic ear from Cordelia, who forgets in her compassion that Darla is still very evil.

Plot
In a flashback to Rome, 1771, Angelus flees through the sewers from a group of priests, but is eventually cornered and then Daniel Holtz arrives. He appreciates the priest's assistance in capturing and chaining Angelus, then begins to torture the vampire for his murderous crimes against Holtz's family. As Holtz continues his torture as he carries on a conversation with Angelus about his family, Darla and their attempts to hide. Darla eventually arrives with more vampires who kill the priests, rescue Angelus, and leave Holtz hurt, but alive, as they ride away hidden by a blanket on a cart.

Darla gets off of a bus, leaving behind mostly dead passengers.

Cordelia and Angel continue with their training and Cordelia has now begun to work on fighting without weapons. He says she can't hurt him, but Cordelia hits him in the face and clearly causes a little bit of pain. They talk about Wesley and Gunn, who are investigating a Nyazian scroll that could forecast the end of the world.

Meanwhile, Wesley and Gunn enter a guarded building and find a room with countless artifacts and expensive items. An armed man catches them and threatens to call the police, but Wesley and Gunn threaten the artifacts and the man lets them get what they came for.

Fred walks in on Cordelia and Angel's training session just as Cordelia ends the session. After Cordelia leaves, Fred mentions that she thinks there is some kind of physical attraction between Angel and Cordelia, which Angel quickly refutes. Just then, Wesley pulls Fred away from Angel to work on deciphering the scrolls. Fred's math skills are useful but she has some difficulty figuring out the proper date for the world's end. Wesley explains the text and the bringing of a "Tro-klon" being that will end mankind, and with Cordelia's help retells the results of their last scroll investigation for Fred's purpose.

Angel, thinking about his earlier conversation with Fred, watches Cordelia as she works. When she asks him about his strange behavior, he starts awkwardly mentioning their history together. She gets freaked out at first, but then starts a chain of professing love between all of the gang, thinking Angel fears the world ending and wants to express his love to her and all of his friends. Angel uses her misinterpretation to get out of the awkward situation and the subject is dropped. Darla arrives at the hotel and shocks the whole gang with her very pregnant state, especially Angel after nervously realizing that he is the father. 

Darla accuses Angel of causing her pregnancy deliberately, but he's just as shocked as she is of them somehow being able to conceive in addition to being embarrassed and distressed by the whole situation. Both Darla and Angel want to find out what's inside of the former, in addition Darla wants to terminate her pregnancy while Angel initially denies of his forthcoming fatherhood; he ultimately become fearful of both it and his unborn child's nature. In need of answers, the gang find Lorne in the process of rebuilding the club and the Furies casting a new spell to prevent all violence in the club. After a brief, but unnecessary line of song from Darla, Lorne reveals that he's just as stumped as the rest of them about the creature inside of her.

Darla starts to cry out in pain and is escorted back to Lorne's room where Cordelia, keeps her company. Angel still denies the possibility of Darla's pregnancy and questions the baby's connection to the prophecy. He doesn't know whether his purpose was supposed to bring forth the evil or destroy it. Cordelia talks to Darla about being pregnant. Cordelia brings up Darla's ability to drink blood, which leads to the vampire attacking Cordelia as she reveals her hunger is constant and uncontrollable.

Cordelia fights back with a few hits, but Darla is stronger and bites her. A powerful vision hits Cordelia which allows her to push Darla away from her neck long enough for Angel to show up and intervene. Darla biting Cordelia has motivated him enough to kill his sire, but she's already gone. Cordy is taken to a safe place to rest where she blames herself for trusting Darla and tells Angel about her vision. She reveals how hungry Darla is and that she might be at an arcade with many children to feed from.

Angel leaves her to get weapons and find Darla. Wesley is worried about Darla's new and improved strength that's a result of her unborn child, but Angel feels responsible and refuses help, and Fred understands that Angel do not wish to kill his offspring (because he does want to be a father) yet he hopelessly feels that he has no choice, due to likelihood that the child would be born as a vampire. Cordelia gets another vision about Darla's baby and goes to talk to Wesley and the rest of the gang about it. Angel stops Darla from killing a young boy and tries to stake her, but she stops him and taunts him. The two fight viciously, with Angel being enraged after Darla described her bloodlust, believing it was the unborn child's. He ends up in a position to stake her, but he hesitates and later realizes the baby inside of Darla has both a heartbeat and a soul, which is what's driving her so crazy and making her so hungry for the pure blood of children. Darla denies the truth and Angel does everything he can to comfort her while having hope for his child.

Back at the hotel, Darla has returned with Angel and rests in one of the bedrooms. She rejects the animal blood Angel offers her and tells Angel to leave her alone. Downstairs, research on the prophecy continues as Angel instructs the women to stay away from Darla unless he or Gunn are with them. Angel and Cordy discuss the baby and Angel's feelings towards it, and Angel begins to take responsibility for it as a father. Fred finally deciphers the text of the prophecy; she reveals that this being is arriving right then while unbeknownst to the gang, a demon is performing a ritual underground in front of a large stone. The ritual complete, the stone crumbles away, revealing a newly revived Holtz, eager to find Angelus.

Production
In an essay examining cinematic effects on Angel, Tammy Kinsey points out how this episode uses "several excellent examples of cinematic experimentation", such as when Darla attacks Cordelia while she is having a vision. Although the scene only lasts about twenty seconds, Kinsey argues that the use of slow motion and repetition "makes it seem to go on much longer." The flashes of light and movement "press the viewer into a space of anxiety and terror", Kinsey writes, "reminiscent of the paintings of Francis Bacon". Another avant-garde technique is used when Cordelia later has a vision about Darla's baby; a lab process called bleach bypass, which leaves silver deposits on the film stock, intensifies the blacks while desaturating the colors. This gives the scene "a creepy uncertainty", Kinsey says. "We do not know whether this is visionary or a daydream, and the shift in formal design elements here enhances the surreal feeling."

Continuity
Lorne acts surprised as he finds out that Angel slept with Darla, even though Angel went to see him afterwards and said, "Okay keep your pants on (Angel walks into Lorne's view).  Well I think we're too late for that."  This does not necessarily indicate that Lorne knew whom Angel had slept with, merely that he had recently had sex.

Arc significance
Holtz is awakened in the present.
Sahjhan appears for the first time.
Darla returns to Angel Investigations to bring Angel the news that he is going to be a father.
Angel Investigations not only learn about Darla's pregnancy but also finally discover Angel and Darla slept together recently.
Lorne starts rebuilding Caritas and the Furies once again turn it into a sanctuary.
 Fred points out for the first time the mutual attraction between Angel and Cordelia. This attraction will continue to develop throughout the series till Cordelia's departure.
 Cordelia appears to be hurt and betrayed by the fact that Angel slept with Darla even though she knew about it in Disharmony.

References

External links

 

Angel (season 3) episodes
2001 American television episodes
Television episodes written by David Greenwalt
Pregnancy-themed television episodes
Television episodes set in Rome